Law of the Horse was a term used in the mid-1990s to define the state of cyberlaw during the nascent years of the Internet.

The term first gained prominence in a 1996 cyberlaw conference presentation by Judge Frank H. Easterbrook of the United States Court of Appeals for the Seventh Circuit. Easterbrook, who was also on the faculty of the University of Chicago, later published his presentation in the University of Chicago Legal Forum as "Cyberspace and the Law of the Horse", in which he argued against the notion of defining cyberlaw as a unique section of legal studies and litigation. Easterbrook cited Gerhard Casper as coining the expression “law of the horse,” and stated that Casper's arguments against specialized or niche legal studies applied to cyberlaw:

Easterbrook's theory was challenged by Lawrence Lessig, a professor at Harvard Law School, in a 1999 article "The Law of the Horse: What Cyberlaw Might Teach." Lessig's article, which was first presented at the Boston University Law School Faculty Workshop, argued that legal perceptions and rules would need to evolve as the cyberspace environment developed and expanded.

See also
 Declaration of the Independence of Cyberspace

References

Computer law
Works about computer law
Cyberspace
Metaphors referring to horses